This list of airlines of Africa covers airlines of Africa that are currently in operation. It is divided into sub-lists by country.

Africa

Algeria

Angola

Benin

Botswana

Burkina Faso

Burundi
Burundi Airlines

Cameroon

Cape Verde

Central African Republic

Chad

Comoros

Democratic Republic of Congo

Congo, Republic of

Djibouti

Egypt

Equatorial Guinea

Eritrea
Eritrean Airlines

Eswatini

Ethiopia

Gabon

Gambia, The

Ghana

Guinea
Guinea has no active airlines.

Guinea-Bissau
Guinea-Bissau has no active airlines.

Ivory Coast

Kenya

Lesotho
Lesotho has no active airlines.

Liberia
Liberia has no active airlines.

Libya

Madagascar

Malawi

Mali

Mauritania

Mauritius

Morocco

Mozambique

Namibia

Niger

Nigeria

Rwanda

São Tomé and Príncipe

Senegal

Seychelles

Sierra Leone
Sierra Leone has no active airlines.

Somalia

South Africa

South Sudan

Sudan

Tanzania

Togo

Tunisia

Uganda

Zambia

Zimbabwe

Notes
Dependencies and other territories
 has no airlines operating from within the territory
 - List of airlines of Spain
 has no airlines operating from within the territory
 - List of airlines of Portugal
 - List of airlines of Mayotte
 - List of airlines of Spain
 - List of airlines of Réunion
 has no airlines operating from within the territory
 has no airlines operating from within the territory

States with limited recognition
 has no active airlines
 has no active airlines

See also

 List of largest airlines in Africa
 List of defunct airlines of Africa

References